The subfamily Pemphredoninae also known as the aphid wasps, is a large group in the wasp family Crabronidae, with over 1000 species. Historically, this subfamily has frequently been accorded family status. In some recent phylogenetic analyses, one of the subtribes within this group is the sister lineage to the superfamily Apoidea, and accorded family rank as Ammoplanidae along with Pemphredonidae and Psenidae so as to keep families monophyletic.

The subfamily consists of solitary wasps, each genus having its own distinct and consistent prey preferences. The adult females dig tunnels in the ground, or plant material, for nesting.

As with all other sphecoid wasps, the larvae are carnivorous; females hunt for prey on which to lay their eggs, mass provisioning the nest cells with paralyzed, living prey that the larvae feed upon after hatching from the egg.

Subdivisions
In most classifications, the Pemphredoninae are divided into four tribes: Entomosericini, Odontosphecini, Psenini, and Pemphredonini; the last of which has by far the largest number of species. The primary distinction between the Psenini and the Pemphredonini is that Psenini have a forewing with three submarginal cells, while Pemphredonini never have more than two submarginal cells in their forewing. More recent classifications treat Psenidae (including Odontosphecini) as a separate family, and sister to the newly-erected family Ammoplanidae, while Pemphredonidae (excluding Ammoplanina) is sister taxon to the Philanthidae.

Fossils
Two fossilized wasps from the Weald Clay, Archisphex and Angarosphex are considered to possibly be in the Pemphredoninae.

Notes

References
 Bohart, R. M. and Menke, A. S. (1976) Sphecid Wasps of the World: a Generic Revision  University of California Press, Berkeley, California,  Google books
 Simon-Thomas,  R. T. and Bohart, R. M. (1998) A recapitulation of errata and omissions to Sphecid wasps of the world, a generic revision, by R.M. Bohart & A.S. Menke Instituut voor Systematiek en Populatiebiologie, University of Amsterdam, Amsterdam,

External links
 "Pemphredoninae  Dahlbom, 1835"  ITIS Report
 Photographs "Subfamily Pemphredoninae - Aphid Wasps" Bug Guide
 Photographs "Pemphredoninae" Flickr

Crabronidae
Apocrita subfamilies